The Battle of the Bzura (or the Battle of Kutno) was the largest Polish counter-attack of the German invasion of Poland and was fought from 9 to 19 September. The battle took place west of Warsaw, near the Bzura River. It began as a Polish counter-offensive, which gained initial success, but the Germans outflanked the Polish forces with a concentrated counter-attack. That weakened Polish forces and the Poznań and Pomorze Armies were destroyed. Western Poland was now under German occupation. The battle has been described as "the bloodiest and most bitter battle of the entire Polish campaign". Winston Churchill called the battle an "ever-glorious struggle".

Background 

The Polish plan to defend from the German invasion, Plan West, called to defend the borders. That was dictated more by political than military concerns, as Poles feared that the Germans, after they had taken over the territories that they had lost by the Treaty of Versailles, would try to end the war by keeping those territories. Defending the borders was risky, but the Poles were counting on a British and French counteroffensive, (which never came). That made Army Pomorze, under General Władysław Bortnowski, find itself in the Polish Corridor while it was surrounded by German forces on two fronts. Army Poznań, under General Tadeusz Kutrzeba, was pushed to the westernmost fringes of Poland and was separated from its primary defensive positions and from other Polish Armies.

The German offensive proved the folly of the Polish border defence plan during the first days of the war. Army Pomorze was defeated at the Battle of Bory Tucholskie and was forced to retreat to the south-east. Army Poznań, meanwhile, did not face heavy German assaults but was forced to retreat to the east by defeats of its neighbours (Army Pomorze in the north and Army Łódź in the south). Both of them were retreating and so Army Poznań was in danger of being flanked and surrounded by the German forces. On 4 September, Army Poznań moved through Poznań and abandoned it to the enemy although at that point, it was not in contact with any significant German forces. By 6 September, Armies Pomorze and Poznań had linked and formed the strongest Polish operational unit in the campaign, and General Bortnowski accepted the command of General Kutrzeba.

On 7 September, the Polish forces became aware of the German push towards Łęczyca, which, if successful, could cut off the retreat route of Polish forces. By 8 September, advanced German troops reached Warsaw, which marked the beginning of the Siege of Warsaw. At the same time, German forces had lost contact with Army Poznań, and the German command assumed that the army must have been transported by rail to aid Warsaw's defence. They were unaware that in fact Army Poznań had merged forces with Army Pomorze, which they considered, since its defeat at Bory Tucholskie, to be no longer a significant threat. On 8 September, the Germans were certain that they had eliminated major Polish resistance west of Vistula and so prepared to cross it and to engage the Polish forces on the other side.

Meanwhile, General Kutrzeba and his staff officers had suspected, even before the German invasion, that it would be the neighbouring armies that would bear the German attack and so they had developed plans at an offensive to the south to relieve Army Łódź. During the first week of the campaign, however, those plans were rejected by the Polish commander-in-chief, Marshal Edward Rydz-Śmigły. By 8 September, Kutrzeba had lost contact with Rydz-Śmigły, who had relocated his command center from Warsaw to Brest. Those factors made Kutrzeba decide to go forward with his plan. His situation was dire, as German forces were close to surrounding his units: the German 8th Army had secured the southern bank of the [[Bzriver, and the German 4th Army had secured the northern bank of Vistula, from Włocławek to Wyszogród, and its elements were attacking the rear of the Armies Pomorze and Poznań from the direction of Inowrocław and crossing the Vistula near Płock.

Opposing forces 
The Polish forces consisted of Army Poznań and Army Pomorze. The German forces included the 8th Army under Johannes Blaskowitz and 10th Army under Walther von Reichenau of Army Group South (Heeresgruppe Süd), elements of the 4th Army under Günther von Kluge of the Army Group North (Heeresgruppe Nord) and air support (Luftflotte 1 and Luftflotte 4).

Battle 
The battle can be divided into three phases:
 Phase I — Polish offensive towards Stryków, aiming at the flank of the German 10th Army (9–12 September)
 Phase II — Polish offensive towards Łowicz (13–15 September)
 Phase III — German counterattack and eventual defeat of the Poles, who withdraw towards Warsaw and 
Modlin (16–19 September)

On the night of 9 September, the Polish Poznań Army commenced a counterattack from the south of the Bzura river, its target being the German forces from the 8th Army advancing between Łęczyca and Łowicz towards Stryków. The commander of Poznań Army, Tadeusz Kutrzeba noticed that the German 8th Army, which was commanded by General Johannes Blaskowitz, was weakly secured from the north by only the 30th Infantry Division, which stretched over a 30 km defensive line while the rest of the army was advancing towards Warsaw. The main thrust of the Polish offensive were the units under General Edmund Knoll-Kownacki, which were known as the Knoll-Kownacki Operational Group (Polish 14th, 17th, 25th and 26th Infantry Divisions). The right wing of the offensive, in the area Łęczyce, included the Podolska Cavalry Brigade under Col. L. Strzelecki, and on the left, advancing from Łowicz to the area of Głowno, the Wielkopolska Cavalry Brigade under General Roman Abraham. These groups inflicted considerable losses on the German defenders from the 30th Infantry Division and the 24th Infantry Division, with some 1,500 German soldiers killed or wounded and an additional 3,000 lost as prisoners during the initial push. The cavalry brigades, supplemented with TKS and TK-3 reconnaissance tanks, moved to threaten the flanks and the rear of the advancing German units.

The German forces were thrown back approximately 20 km, and the Poles recaptured several towns, including Łęczyca and Piątek, and the village of Góra Świętej Małgorzaty. On 10 September, the Polish 17th Infantry Division met the German 17th Infantry Division at Małachowicze. The following day, Polish forces continued their attack and advanced on Modlna, Pludwiny, Osse and Głowno.

Initially underestimating the Polish advance, the Germans decided on 11 September to redirect the main force of the German 10th Army, the German 4th Army, the reserves of the Army Group South and aircraft from 4th Air Fleet towards the Bzura. The forces included the German 1st Panzer Division, German 4th Panzer Division and the newly-formed SS Infantry regiment Leibstandarte Adolf Hitler. German air superiority had a significant impact by making it very costly and difficult for the Poles to move units during the day. The following day, the Poles reached the line Stryków-Ozorków. That day, General Tadeusz Kutrzeba learned that units of Army Łódź had retreated to the Modlin Fortress and decided to stop the offensive and instead sought to try to break through Sochaczew and the Kampinos Forest to reach Warsaw.

On the morning of 14 September, General Władysław Bortnowski's 26th and 16th Infantry Divisions crossed the Bzura near Łowicz. The Polish 4th Infantry Division reached the road linking Łowicz with Głowno. At that point, however, Bortnowski ordered the 26th Infantry Division to retreat. He had learned of the withdrawal of the German 4th Panzer Division from the outskirts of Warsaw and was concerned that the Panzer division posed a threat to his men.

On 15 and 16 September, Army Pomorze took up defensive positions on the north bank of the Bzura. General Stanisław Grzmot-Skotnicki's group between Kutno and Żychlin, General Michał Karaszewicz-Tokarzewski's units near Gąbin and parts of Army Poznań by the Bzura near Sochaczew were ready to begin their drive towards Warsaw. To encircle and to destroy the Polish forces, the Germans used most of their 10th Army, including two armoured, one motorized and three light divisions, which was equipped with some 800 tanks altogether. The attack from all sides on Polish positions started on 16 September with the support of the Luftwaffe. On 15 September, the Poles were forced out of Sochaczew, a town on the Bzura river, and were trapped in a triangle of Bzura, Vistula and German forces. The German 1st Panzer Division, after crossing the Bzura between Sochaczew and Brochów and engaging the Polish 25th Infantry Division, managed to capture Ruszki, but its advance was then halted. Poles began to cross the Bzura near the Vistula, north of Sochaczew, and retreat towards Warsaw. 

The Polish forces were forced to abandon most of their heavy equipment while they crossed the river. On 17 September, German heavy artillery was shelling the crossing north of Brochów, and the largest air operation of the campaign began, with the Luftwaffe attacking the retreating Polish forces.

During the night of 17 September, the main forces of Army Poznań attacked the German forces to break out of the German encirclement between Witkowice and Sochaczew. The 15th Infantry Division and Podolska Cavalry Brigade again crossed the Bzura in Witkowice. In Brochow, the 25th and the 17th Infantry Divisions crossed the Bzura. The 14th Infantry Division was concentrated in Łaziska. At the same time, Army Pomorze marched towards the villages of Osmolin, Kierozia and Osiek.

In the morning, the Germans started their drive towards the south along both banks of the Bzura and were supported by more than 300 aircraft and heavy artillery. German howitzers, taking advantage of their position on the high ground of the Vistula's right bank, shelled Polish positions for the entire day. After two days of heavy fighting, with no ammunition or food rations remaining, further attempts at a breakout for the Poles became impossible.

Aftermath 

Only a few Polish units managed to break out of the encirclement. The groups entered Warsaw and Modlin, mostly around 19 and 20 September, crossed the Kampinos Forest and fought German units in the area (such as ar the Battle of Wólka Węglowa). Among them were Generals Kutrzeba, Knoll-Kowacki and Tokarzewski, two cavalry brigades (Wielkopolska and Podolska) of General Abraham and the 15th and 25th Infantry Divisions. The remainder (4th, 14th, 17th, 26th and 27th Infantry Divisions), which did not manage to cross the river, surrendered with General Bortnowski between 18 and 22 September. Polish casualties were estimated at 20,000 dead, including three generals: Franciszek Wład, Stanisław Grzmot-Skotnicki and Mikołaj Bołtuć. German casualties are estimated at 8,000 dead.

After the battle, the remaining German divisions rushed towards Warsaw and Modlin and soon encircled both. The Bzura campaign ended in defeat for the Poles, but because of the initial Polish local successes, the German advance on Warsaw was halted for several days. The Wehrmacht was required to divert units from its push towards Warsaw. That helped the Polish units defending Warsaw and its environs to organise their own long-term but ultimately failed defence of the capital.

The campaign also showed the importance of taking initiative, proved that horse cavalry units were still an important factor on the battlefield, proved the importance of air superiority and confirmed that simple numerical superiority still mattered.

See also 

 List of World War II military equipment of Poland
 List of German military equipment of World War II

Notes

References
  Sławomir Cisowski, Wojciech Zalewski, Bitwa nad Bzurą, Chwała Oręża Polskiego 26 (47), Rzeczpospolita, 20 January 2007 (publication contains a map of the battle).
Stanley S.Seidner, Marshal Edward Śmigły-Rydz Rydz and the Defense of Poland, New York, 1978.

External links

 

Battles of the Invasion of Poland
World War II sites in Poland
World War II sites of Nazi Germany
Łódź Voivodeship (1919–1939)
September 1939 events